Stephen "Stevie" Gray (born 7 February 1967 in Glasgow; died 19 September 2009 in Irvine) was a Scottish professional footballer who played as a right winger. Gray made 85 appearances in the Scottish Football League for Aberdeen and Airdrie between 1985 and 1993. Gray also represented Scotland at under-21 international level.

He won the Scottish Youth Cup with Aberdeen in 1985, and then broke into the first team managed by Alex Ferguson, winning the 1985 Scottish League Cup Final. He left Aberdeen in 1989 to join second-tier Airdrie for a fee of £70,000, where he was part of the team managed by Jimmy Bone which achieved promotion to the Premier Division in 1991, but he dropped out of the senior game in 1993 to sign for Highland League team Huntly.

After Gray's death, former teammate Stewart McKimmie commented that Gray had perhaps lost his way after Ferguson left Aberdeen in 1986.

References

External links

Profile and stats at AFC Heritage Trust

1967 births
2009 deaths
Footballers from Glasgow
Scottish footballers
Association football wingers
Aberdeen F.C. players
Airdrieonians F.C. (1878) players
Huntly F.C. players
Scottish Football League players
Highland Football League players
Scotland under-21 international footballers